Wycombe Marsh is an area of High Wycombe, Buckinghamshire, England. Wycombe Marsh is in the Ryemead ward of High Wycombe, which had a population of 7,188 at the 2011 Census.

Features
Wycombe Marsh is home to Wycombe Retail Park, whose stores include Currys PC World, Marks & Spencer, Argos, Wickes and Pets at Home. There are multiple residential areas, including Wye Dene. The area is served by Marsh Infant School and Nursery and three small churches.

Wycombe Marsh also lies on the abandoned section of the Wycombe Railway between High Wycombe and Bourne End, that opened in 1854 and closed in 1970. Trackbed can still be found in the area.

History
Wycombe's location as a well-watered valley protected by higher ground, meant that it was favourable to prehistoric settlements, of which traces have been found at Wycombe Marsh dating from the Bronze Age. In previous centuries, Wycombe Marsh was home to mills and was engaged in the manufacture of paper. In the 21st Century, Wycombe Marsh has undergone  major redevelopment. Brownfield land such as Thames Water's redundant sewage treatment works has been converted into a retail park, and more recently, a housing development.

References

Hamlets in Buckinghamshire
High Wycombe